The HTC Radar (also known as HTC Radar 4G) is a smartphone running the Windows Phone OS. The phone was designed and manufactured by HTC Corporation. It was announced 1 September 2011, and launched on 12 October 2011.

Description
HTC announced the HTC Radar on 1 September 2011 in London, along with the higher end HTC Titan. The devices were HTC's first smartphones to ship natively with Windows Phone Mango (7.5).

Launch
Microsoft launched HTC Radar, powered by Windows Phone 7.5 Operating system (Codenamed Mango), on 12 October 2011 in India. HTC Radar is the first Mango powered Smart phone in India.

Reception
Ross Miller of The Verge in his review wrote: "Finally, for the platform agnostic – for those who aren’t committed to purchasing Windows Phone hardware – I’m still not quite sure I can recommend this over an Android phone of similar value."

See also
Windows Phone

References

External links

Windows Phone devices
HTC smartphones
Discontinued smartphones